The 1976 NCAA Skiing Championships were contested at Sunday River ski area, near the town of Newry, Maine, at the 23rd annual NCAA-sanctioned ski tournament to determine the individual and team national champions of men's collegiate alpine, cross country skiing, and ski jumping in the United States.

Four-time defending champion Colorado, coached by alumnus Bill Marolt, finished tied with Dartmouth, coached by Jim Page, atop the team standings, with 112 points each, and shared the team national championship. Both teams finished a mere four points ahead of third-place Vermont; this was the seventh title for the Buffaloes and the second for the Big Green.

Venue

This year's championships were held March 3–6 in Maine at Sunday River ski area in the town of Newry. Bates College of Lewiston served as host.

These were the second NCAA championships in Maine (1967, Sugarloaf) and eighth in the East, all in New England.

Team scoring

Individual events

Four events were held, which yielded six individual titles.
Wednesday: Giant Slalom
Thursday: Cross Country
Friday: Slalom
Saturday: Jumping

See also
List of NCAA skiing programs

References

NCAA Skiing Championships
NCAA Skiing Championships
NCAA Skiing Championships
NCAA Skiing Championships
NCAA Skiing Championships
NCAA Skiing Championships
NCAA Skiing Championships
Skiing in Maine
College sports tournaments in Maine
Newry, Maine